The Chairman of the Kostroma Oblast Duma is the presiding officer of that legislature.

Office-holders

Sources 
Kostroma Oblast Duma

Lists of legislative speakers in Russia
Politics of Kostroma Oblast